1919 in Argentine football saw the "Asociación Argentina de Football" (AFA) league championship abandoned mid season. The clubs then split between two different associations. The majority of the clubs joined the new "Asociación Amateurs de Football" (AAm) while six clubs remained with the official body.

Boca Juniors won four titles that year, including the Primera División and three cups, domestic Copa de Competencia Jockey Club and Copa Ibarguren and the international Tie Cup. Meanwhile, Racing Club joined the dissident Asociación Amateurs and won it to achieve its 7th consecutive league championship.

Primera División

Asociación Argentina de Football - Copa Campeonato
The 1919 season started on 16 March 1919 but the tournament was annulled due to internal problems. Therefore a new dissident Association was created and there were two tournaments disputed at the same time.

After the schism the Asociación Argentina organized a tournament with the few remaining teams, 6 in total. Boca Juniors was declared champion with 14 fixtures to be played.

Asociación Amateurs de Football
Internal problems in the Association caused that some members left to create a new league: the Asociación Amateurs de Football, which organized its own championships. Racing Club joined the new rival association winning the tournament, its 7th consecutive league title.

Vélez Sársfield played its first Primera División championship after being disaffiliated from the Asociación Argentina.

Lower divisions

Intermedia
AFA Champion: Banfield
AAm Champion: Barracas Central

Segunda División
AFA Champion: El Porvenir
AAm Champion: Sportivo Barracas III

Domestic cups

Copa de Competencia Jockey Club
Champion: Boca Juniors

Final

Copa Ibarguren
Champion: Boca Juniors

Final

International cups

Tie Cup
Champion:  Boca Juniors

Final

Copa Aldao
Champion:  Nacional

Final

Argentina national team

Copa América
Argentina travelled to Brazil to play in the 3rd edition of Copa América. They finished in 3rd place behind hosts Brazil and runners-up Uruguay.

Titles
Copa Premier Honor Argentino 1919

Results

Notes

References

 
Seasons in Argentine football